Oval Bible College (OBC) is an independent religious institution founded by Dr. Timmy Tezeno in June 2000 in Lake Charles, Louisiana, United States. The College, which provides theological education, is now located in Lake Charles, Louisiana.

Oval Bible College operates in 38 states and several countries, including Greece, China, West Indies, Nigeria, South Africa, Mauritius, Singapore, Canada, Australia, Mexico, United Kingdom, Puerto Rico, Kenya, Philippines, Virgin Islands, Norway, Germany, India, Italy, Antigua and Barbuda, Haiti, and Ghana.

References

External links

 National Bible College Association: Official website

2000 establishments in Louisiana
Bible colleges
Distance education institutions based in the United States
Organizations established in 2000
Religious organizations based in the United States
Christian universities and colleges in the United States